Anton Dubrov (born 18 June 1995) is a Belarusian tennis coach and former player. He has coached Women's Tennis Association (WTA) player Aryna Sabalenka since 2020.

Career

Dubrov started playing tennis at age five. His peak International Tennis Federation (ITF) junior ranking was No. 272, reached in 2013 by having won a Grade 5 doubles title and a Grade 4 singles title the previous year on the ITF Junior Circuit. Over the course of his playing career, he earned a single Association of Tennis Professionals (ATP) ranking point by winning just one out of his ten main-draw singles matches on the ITF Men's Circuit from 2013 to 2015, but continued occasionally until 2018 to enter ITF qualifying draws.

A longtime member of Aryna Sabalenka's team as her hitting partner, Dubrov became Sabalenka's primary coach in 2020, replacing longtime coach Dmitry Tursunov after a short-term experiment with Dieter Kindlmann. Sabalenka, ranked just outside the WTA's top 10 in 2020, found increasingly consistent results with Dubrov, winning four WTA Tour titles in the first year of his coaching tenure. Ranked world No. 2 by the end of 2021, she credited him with helping her feel more "confident" in her game, offering feedback "in a nice way".

In February 2022, as Sabalenka resisted her team's efforts to rework her serve while having high-profile trouble with double faults, Dubrov offered to resign, but Sabalenka convinced him to stay on, promising that "we'll come back stronger". An expert in biomechanics was brought in to help fix her serve in August 2022, and after winning her first major singles title at the 2023 Australian Open, she thanked her "craziest team on tour" of Dubrov and fitness trainer Jason Stacy for supporting her over a tumultuous previous year.

References

External links

1995 births
Living people
Belarusian tennis players
Belarusian tennis coaches